"Carrie" is a song performed by Cliff Richard and released in December 1979 as the third single lifted from Richard's album Rock 'n' Roll Juvenile. It reached number 4 in the UK Singles Chart and became an international hit.

Composition
"Carrie" was written by the songwriting partnership of Terry Britten and BA Robertson, who had written Richard previous single "Hot Shot" and who also wrote several other songs for Rock 'n' Roll Juvenile. Britten initially came up with the riff and the title, but he "realized that it would take someone who knew what they were doing to make it into a proper song", so he got Robertson to come up with the story. Speaking about the song, Robertson has said:

Recording and release
The backing track was recorded between 7 and 12 January 1979 at the EMI Pathé-Marconi Studios in Paris and the vocals were later recorded at Abbey Road Studios in London on 2 February. The recording engineers were Tony Clark and Haydn Bendall.

"Carrie" was released in the majority of territories with the B-side "Moving In", which was written and produced by Richard. It was first released as a single in the Netherlands and Germany at the beginning of December 1979, before being released in Australia on 12 December with the B-side "Walking in the Light", written by Britten. "Carrie" was later re-released in Australia in March 1980 with "Moving In" as the B-side. In the UK, the single was released on 18 January 1980.

The single release of "Carrie" is an edit of the album version and also actually runs slightly faster. However, the album version was released on the original Australian single and the US and Canadian single. The latter was also released with a different B-side, "Language of Love", also written by Britten and Robertson, in February 1980.

Reception
Reviewing for Record Mirror, Simon Ludgate gave it 'Single of the Week', writing that "it's astounding, the hits keep rolling off 'Rock 'n' Roll Juvenile', from which this is taken. To be producing high-pop songs like this after 25 years in the Biz is extraordinary", adding that Richard's "delivery is immaculate and his timing superb. You can't ignore a classic popstar: credit must be given".

In a contemporary review for AllMusic, Dave Thompson described the song as "a deliberately sinister and enthrallingly atmospheric number, revolving around the search for a mysteriously missing friend ("Carrie had a date with her own kind of fate")" and that "in other hands, such lines as "you're just another message on a payphone wall" and "the young wear their freedom like cheap perfume" could sound trite. Richard imbibes them with both pertinence and importance, while the emotion in his voice colors even the title.

Track listing
7": EMI / EMI 5006
 "Carrie" – 3:28
 "Moving In" – 3:26

7": EMI / EMI-168 (Australia)
 "Carrie" – 3:42
 "Walking in the Light" – 3:08

7": EMI / 8035 (US and Canada)
 "Carrie" – 3:42
 "Language of Love" – 4:39

Personnel
Cliff Richard – vocals, backing vocals
Terry Britten – guitar, backing vocals
Herbie Flowers – bass
Graham Jarvis – drums
Billy Livsey – keyboards
Tristan Fry – percussion
Mel Collins – saxophone

Charts and certifications

Weekly charts

Year-end charts

Certifications

Cover versions
 In the same week in May 1980 that Richard's version peaked in Canada, a cover by Canadian progressive rock band Cano reached a higher peak at number 78.

References

1979 singles
Cliff Richard songs
EMI Records singles
Songs written by BA Robertson
Songs written by Terry Britten
1979 songs